In Norse mythology, Gróa (possibly from Old Norse "growing") is a völva (seeress) and practitioner of seiðr. She is the wife of Aurvandil the Bold.

Attestations

Prose Edda

Gróa appears in the Prose Edda book Skáldskaparmál, in the context of Thor's battle with the jötunn Hrungnir. After Thor has dispatched Hrungnir with the hammer Mjollnir, Gróa is asked to help magically remove shards of Hrungnir's whetstone which became embedded in Thor's head. Unfortunately while Gróa was about her work, Thor distracted her by telling her of how he had earlier helped Aurvandil cross the river Élivágar, and had saved her husband's life by snapping off his frost-bitten toe. Gróa's spell miscarried and the pieces of whetstone remained permanently embedded in Thor's head.

Poetic Edda

Gróa is also a völva (or seeress), summoned from beyond the grave, in the Old Norse poem Grógaldr, (a section of Svipdagsmál), by her son Svipdagr. In death she has lost none of her prophetic powers, and is able to assist him in a successful conclusion of the task which he has been set by his cruel stepmother. It is possible that this second Gróa is the same as the first one, but the poem is a late 17th-century imitation of the Edda.

Gesta Danorum
In Gesta Danorum, Gro is a woman saved from marrying a giant by King Gram. In Viktor Rydberg's elaborate theories on Norse mythology this Gro, too, is the same.

Notes

References
Orchard, Andy (1997). Dictionary of Norse Myth and Legend. Cassell. 

Characters in Norse mythology
Germanic seeresses
Women in mythology